HMS Woodpecker may refer to:

HMS Woodpecker a Modified W-class destroyer cancelled before laying down in 1918
 a  sloop launched in 1942 and sunk in 1944

References

Royal Navy ship names